Rosemary's Baby is a 1968 American psychological horror film written and directed by Roman Polanski, based on Ira Levin's 1967 novel of the same name. The film stars Mia Farrow as a young (soon pregnant) wife living in Manhattan who comes to suspect that her elderly neighbors are members of a Satanic cult and are grooming her in order to use her baby for their rituals. The film's supporting cast includes John Cassavetes, Ruth Gordon, Sidney Blackmer, Maurice Evans, Ralph Bellamy, Patsy Kelly, Angela Dorian, and, in his feature film debut, Charles Grodin.

The film deals with themes related to paranoia, women's liberation, Christianity (Catholicism), and the occult. While it is primarily set in New York City, the majority of principal photography for Rosemary's Baby took place in Los Angeles throughout late 1967. The film was released on June 12, 1968 by Paramount Pictures, and was a box office success, grossing over $30 million in the United States. It received almost universal acclaim and was nominated for several accolades, including multiple Golden Globe Award nominations and two Academy Award nominations, winning Best Supporting Actress (for Ruth Gordon) and the Golden Globe in the same category. Since its release, Rosemary's Baby has been widely regarded as one of the greatest horror films of all time. In 2014, the film was selected for preservation in the United States National Film Registry by the Library of Congress as being "culturally, historically, or aesthetically significant."

Plot
Guy Woodhouse, a stage actor, and his wife, Rosemary, move into the Bramford, a large Renaissance Revival apartment building in New York City. They disregard their friend Hutch's warning about the Bramford's dark past with witchcraft and murder.

In the laundry room, Rosemary meets a young woman, Terry Gionoffrio, a recovering drug addict whom Minnie and Roman Castevet, the Woodhouses' elderly neighbors, have taken in. One night, Terry apparently jumps to her death from the Castevets' 7th-floor apartment, distressing the Castevets. While Guy grows close to the couple, Rosemary finds them annoying and meddlesome. Minnie gives Terry's pendant to Rosemary as a good luck charm, saying it contains "tannis root".

Guy is cast in a prominent play after the lead actor inexplicably goes blind. With his acting career flourishing, Guy wants to have a baby with Rosemary. On the night that they plan to conceive, Minnie brings over individual cups of chocolate mousse for their dessert. When Rosemary complains that it has a chalky "under-taste" and does not finish it, Guy criticizes her as being ungrateful. Rosemary consumes a bit more to mollify him, then discreetly discards the rest. Soon after, she grows dizzy and passes out. In a dreamlike state, Rosemary hallucinates being raped by a demonic presence (Satan) as Guy, the Castevets, and other Bramford tenants, all nude, watch. The next morning, Guy explains the scratches covering Rosemary's body by claiming that he did not want to miss "baby night" and had sex with her while she was unconscious. He says he has since cut his nails.

Rosemary becomes pregnant, with the baby due the last week of June. The elated Castevets insist that Rosemary goes to their close friend, Dr. Abraham Sapirstein, a prominent obstetrician, rather than her own physician, Dr. Hill. During her first trimester, Rosemary suffers severe abdominal pains and loses weight. By Christmastime, her gaunt appearance alarms her friends and also Hutch, who has been researching the Bramford's history. Before sharing his findings with Rosemary, he falls into a mysterious coma. Rosemary, unable to withstand the pain, insists on seeing Dr. Hill, while Guy argues against it, saying Dr. Sapirstein will be offended. As they argue, the pains suddenly stop and Rosemary feels the baby move.

Three months later, Hutch's friend, Grace Cardiff, informs Rosemary that Hutch is dead. Before dying, he briefly regained consciousness and said to give Rosemary a book on witchcraft, All of Them Witches, along with the cryptic message: "The name is an anagram". Rosemary eventually deduces that Roman Castevet is an anagram for Steven Marcato, the son of a former Bramford resident and a reputed Satanist. She suspects that the Castevets and Dr. Sapirstein belong to a Satanic coven and have sinister intentions for her baby. Guy discounts this and later throws the book away, upsetting Rosemary and making her suspicious of him.

Terrified, she goes to Dr. Hill for help. Assuming that she is delusional, he calls Dr. Sapirstein, who arrives with Guy to take her home, threatening if she resists, to have her sent to a mental hospital. Rosemary locks herself into the apartment, but coven members somehow infiltrate and restrain her. Dr. Sapirstein sedates a hysterical Rosemary, who goes into labor and gives birth. When she awakens, she is told the baby was stillborn. As Rosemary recovers, she notices her pumped breast milk appears to be saved instead of disposed of. She stops taking her prescribed pills, becoming less groggy. When Rosemary hears an infant crying, Guy claims new tenants with a baby have moved into an apartment one floor up.

Believing her baby is alive, Rosemary discovers a hidden door in the bedroom closet leading directly into Minnie and Roman's apartment. Guy, the Castevets, Dr. Sapirstein, and other coven members are there, gathered around a bassinet draped in black with an upside down cross hanging over it. Peering inside, Rosemary is horrified and demands to know what is wrong with her baby's eyes. Roman proclaims that the child, Adrian, Satan's son, "has his father's eyes". He urges Rosemary to mother her child, promising her she will not have to join the coven. When Guy attempts to calm her, saying they will be rewarded and will conceive their own children, she spits in his face. After hearing the infant's cries, however, Rosemary gives in to her maternal instincts and gently rocks the cradle.

Cast

Production

Development
In Rosemary's Baby: A Retrospective, a featurette on the DVD release of the film, screenwriter/director Roman Polanski, Paramount Pictures executive Robert Evans, and production designer Richard Sylbert reminisce at length about the production. Evans recalled William Castle brought him the galley proofs of the book and asked him to purchase the film rights even before Random House published the book in April 1967. The studio head recognized the commercial potential of the project and agreed with the stipulation that Castle, who had a reputation for low-budget horror films, could produce but not direct the film adaptation. He makes a cameo appearance as the man at the phone booth waiting for Mia Farrow's character to finish her call.

François Truffaut claimed that Alfred Hitchcock was first offered the chance to direct the film but declined. Evans admired Polanski's European films and hoped he could convince him to make his American debut with Rosemary's Baby. He knew the director was a ski buff who was anxious to make a film with the sport as its basis, so he sent him the script for Downhill Racer along with the galleys for Rosemary's Baby. Polanski read the latter book non-stop through the night and called Evans the following morning to tell him he thought Rosemary's Baby was the more interesting project, and would like the opportunity to write as well as direct it. After negotiations, Paramount agreed to hire Polanski for the project, with a tentative budget of $1.9 million, $150,000 of which would go to Polanski.

Polanski completed the 272-page screenplay for the film in approximately three weeks. Polanski closely modeled it on the original novel and incorporated large sections of the novel's dialogue and details, with much of it being lifted directly from the source text.

Casting

Casting for Rosemary's Baby began in the summer of 1967 in Los Angeles, California. Polanski originally envisioned Rosemary as a robust, full-figured, girl-next-door type, and wanted Tuesday Weld or his own fiancée Sharon Tate to play the role. Jane Fonda, Patty Duke and Goldie Hawn were also reportedly considered for the role.

Since the book had not yet reached bestseller status, Evans was unsure the title alone would guarantee an audience for the film, and he believed that a bigger name was needed for the lead. Mia Farrow, with a supporting role in Guns at Batasi (1964) and the yet-unreleased A Dandy in Aspic (1968) as her only feature film credits, had an unproven box office track record; however, she had gained wider notice with her role as Allison MacKenzie in the popular television series Peyton Place, and her unexpected marriage to noted singer Frank Sinatra. Despite her waif-like appearance, Polanski agreed to cast her. Her acceptance incensed Sinatra, who had demanded she forgo her career when they wed.

Robert Redford was the first choice for the role of Guy Woodhouse, but he turned it down. Jack Nicholson was considered briefly before Polanski suggested John Cassavetes, whom he had met in London. In casting the film's secondary actors, Polanski drew sketches of what he imagined the characters would look like, which were then used by Paramount casting directors to match with potential actors. In the roles of Roman and Minnie Castevet, Polanski cast veteran stage/film actors Sidney Blackmer and Ruth Gordon. Veteran actor Ralph Bellamy was cast as Dr. Sapirstein. (Many years earlier, Bellamy and Blackmer had appeared in the pre-Code 1934 film, This Man Is Mine.)

When Rosemary calls Donald Baumgart, the actor who goes blind and is replaced by Guy, the voice heard on the phone is actor Tony Curtis. Farrow, who had not been told who would be reading Baumgart's lines, recognized his voice but could not place it. The slight confusion she displays throughout the call was exactly what Polanski hoped to capture by not revealing Curtis' identity in advance.

Filming

Principal photography for Rosemary's Baby began on August 21, 1967, in New York City, where location shooting commenced. When Farrow was reluctant to film a scene that depicted a dazed and preoccupied Rosemary wandering into the middle of Fifth Avenue into oncoming traffic, Polanski pointed to her pregnancy padding and reassured her, "no one's going to hit a pregnant woman". The scene was successfully shot with Farrow walking into real traffic and Polanski following, operating the hand-held camera since he was the only one willing to do it.

By September 1967, the shoot had relocated to California's Paramount Studios in Hollywood, where interior sets of the Bramford apartments had been constructed on sound stages. Some additional location shooting took place in Playa del Rey in October 1967. Farrow recalled that the dream sequence in which her character is attending a dinner party on a yacht was filmed on a vessel near Santa Catalina Island. Though Paramount had initially agreed to spend $1.9 million to make the film, the shoot was overextended due to Polanski's meticulous attention to detail, which resulted in him completing up to fifty takes of single shots. The shoot suffered significant scheduling problems as a result, and ultimately went $400,000 over budget. In November 1967, it was reported that the shoot was over three weeks behind schedule.

The shoot was further disrupted when, midway through filming, Farrow's husband, Frank Sinatra, served her divorce papers via a corporate lawyer in front of the cast and crew. In an effort to salvage her relationship, Farrow asked Evans to release her from her contract, but he persuaded her to remain with the project after showing her an hour-long rough cut and assuring her she would receive an Academy Award nomination for her performance. Filming was completed on December 20, 1967, in Los Angeles.

Music

The lullaby played over the intro is the song "Sleep Safe and Warm", composed by Krzysztof Komeda and sung by Mia Farrow. The composition "Für Elise" is also frequently used as background music throughout the film. The original film soundtrack was released in 1968 via Dot Records. Waxwork Records released the soundtrack from the original master tapes in 2014, including Krzysztof Komeda's original work.

Track listing

Release

Critical response
In contemporary reviews, Renata Adler wrote in The New York Times that
"The movie—although it is pleasant—doesn't seem to work on any of its dark or powerful terms. I think this is because it is almost too extremely plausible. The quality of the young people's lives seems the quality of lives that one knows, even to the point of finding old people next door to avoid and lean on. One gets very annoyed that they don't catch on sooner."

Stanley Eichelbaum of the San Francisco Examiner called the film "a delightful witches brew, a bit over-long for my taste, but nearly always absorbing, suspenseful and easier to swallow than Ira Levin's book. Its suggestions of deviltry in a musty and still-respectable old apartment house on Manhattan's upper West Side are more gracefully and appealingly related than in the novel, which I found awfully silly, when it wasn't downright noxious. The very idea of a contemporary case of witchcraft, in which an innocent young housewife is impregnated by the Devil, is to say the least unnerving, particularly when the pregnancy is marked by all degrees of mental and physical pain."

Variety said, "Several exhilarating milestones are achieved in Rosemary's Baby, an excellent film version of Ira Levin's diabolical chiller novel. Writer-director Roman Polanski has triumphed in his first US-made pic. The film holds attention without explicit violence or gore... Farrow's performance is outstanding."

The Monthly Film Bulletin said that "After the miscalculations of Cul de Sac and Dance of the Vampires", Polanski had "returned to the rich vein of Repulsion". The review noted that "Polanski shows an increasing ability to evoke menace and sheer terror in familiar routines (cooking and telephoning, particularly)," and Polanski has shown "his transformation of a cleverly calculated thriller into a serious work of art."

Today, the film is widely regarded as a classic; it has an approval rating of 96% on review aggregator website Rotten Tomatoes based on 72 reviews, with an average rating of 8.80/10. The site's critics' consensus describes it as "A frightening tale of Satanism and pregnancy that is even more disturbing than it sounds thanks to convincing and committed performances by Mia Farrow and Ruth Gordon." Metacritic reports a weighted average score of 96 out of 100 based on 15 critics, indicating "universal acclaim".

Accolades

Home media 
The Rosemary's Baby DVD, released in 2000 by Paramount Home Video, contains a 23-minute documentary film, Mia and Roman, directed by Shahrokh Hatami, which was shot during the making of the film. The title refers to Mia Farrow and Roman Polanski. The film features footage of Roman Polanski directing the film's cast on set. Hatami was an Iranian photographer who befriended Polanski and his wife Sharon Tate. Mia and Roman was screened originally as a promo film at Hollywood's Lytton Center, and later included as a featurette on the Rosemary's Baby DVD. It is described as a "trippy on-set featurette" and "an odd little bit of cheese."

On October 30, 2012, The Criterion Collection released the film for the first time on Blu-ray.

Legacy
The scene in which Rosemary is raped by Satan was ranked No. 23 on Bravo's The 100 Scariest Movie Moments. In 2010, The Guardian ranked the film the second-greatest horror film of all time. In 2014, it was deemed "culturally, historically, or aesthetically significant" by the Library of Congress and selected for preservation in the National Film Registry.

The film inaugurated cinema's growing fascination with demons and related themes in the coming decades.

Sequels and remakes
In the 1976 television film Look What's Happened to Rosemary's Baby, Patty Duke starred as Rosemary Woodhouse and Ruth Gordon reprised her role of Minnie Castevet. The film introduced an adult Andrew/Adrian attempting to earn his place as the Antichrist. It was disliked as a sequel by critics and viewers, and its reputation deteriorated over the years. The film is unrelated to the novel's sequel, Son of Rosemary.

A remake of Rosemary's Baby was briefly considered in 2008. The intended producers were Michael Bay, Andrew Form, and Brad Fuller. The remake fell through later that same year.

In January 2014, NBC made a four-hour Rosemary's Baby miniseries with Zoe Saldana as Rosemary. The miniseries was filmed in Paris under the direction of Agnieszka Holland.

In 2016, the film was unofficially remade in Turkey under the title Alamet-i-Kiyamet.

The short "Her Only Living Son" from the 2017 horror anthology film XX serves as an unofficial sequel to the story.

In June 2022, Bloody Disgusting stated that the company had received announcement that the film Apartment 7A is secretly a prequel to Rosemary's Baby.

In popular culture
The film inspired the English band Deep Purple to write the song "Why Didn't Rosemary?" for their third album in 1969, after the band had watched the movie while touring the US in 1968. The song's lyrics pose the question, "Why didn't Rosemary ever take the pill?"

The film was parodied in the 1996 Halloween episode of Roseanne, "Satan, Darling".

See also
 List of American films of 1968
 Satanic film
 Anton LaVey

Notes

References

Sources

External links

 
 
 
 
 
 .
 .
 . Collection of Rosemary's Baby posters from around the world.
 BABY, podcast by Culture.pl's Stories From The Eastern West about the making of the film.
 Rosemary's Baby: "It's Alive" – an essay by Ed Park at The Criterion Collection

1968 films
1968 horror films
1960s English-language films
1960s pregnancy films
1960s psychological horror films
1960s supernatural horror films
American pregnancy films
American psychological horror films
American supernatural horror films
The Devil in film
Fictional depictions of the Antichrist
Films about actors
Films about cults
Films about rape
Films about Satanism
Films about witchcraft
Films based on American horror novels
Films based on works by Ira Levin
Films directed by Roman Polanski
Films featuring a Best Supporting Actress Academy Award-winning performance
Films featuring a Best Supporting Actress Golden Globe-winning performance
Films scored by Krzysztof Komeda
Films set in 1965
Films set in 1966
Films set in apartment buildings
Films set in New York City
Films shot in Los Angeles
Films shot in New York City
Films with screenplays by Roman Polanski
Gothic horror films
Paramount Pictures films
Photoplay Awards film of the year winners
United States National Film Registry films
1960s American films